Jeffrey D. Nathanson (born October 12, 1965) is an American screenwriter, director, and producer.

Early life and education 
Nathanson was born on October 12, 1965, in Los Angeles County, California.  He attended the University of California, Santa Barbara as an English major from 1983 to 1985.  While at UC Santa Barbara, he worked on the school's newspaper, the Daily Nexus, and has stated that the courses he took at UC Santa Barbara led him to want to become a screenwriter.  He later enrolled in the screenwriting program at the AFI Conservatory for one year.

Career 
He is best known for his work on the Rush Hour sequels Rush Hour 2 and Rush Hour 3, Catch Me If You Can, The Terminal, and The Last Shot. He co-wrote a story draft for the film Indiana Jones and the Kingdom of the Crystal Skull (2008) with George Lucas; the film was directed by Steven Spielberg. He wrote the screenplay for Pirates of the Caribbean: Dead Men Tell No Tales (2017), on which he also received a story by co-credit, the latter with Terry Rossio. He wrote the script for the 2019 CGI The Lion King remake for Disney, directed by Jon Favreau. He has also been announced to write its upcoming 2024 prequel Mufasa: The Lion King, directed instead by Barry Jenkins.

On October 3, 2017, it was reported that Nathanson would be penning a script for a biographical film directed by Brett Ratner based on the life of the Playboy founder Hugh Hefner, who will be portrayed by Academy Award winner Jared Leto, but the biopic was put indefinitely on hold and was confirmed that Leto would not portray the Playboy founder following an emergence of sexual harassment allegations against Ratner on November 2, 2017.

Honors and awards 
Nathanson was nominated for a Best Original Screenplay British Academy of Film and Television Arts Award for his work on Catch Me If You Can.

Film writer credits

References

External links 
 

Living people
1965 births
21st-century American male writers
AFI Conservatory alumni
American film directors
American film producers
American male screenwriters
Male screenwriters
University of California, Santa Barbara alumni
21st-century American screenwriters